Naoise Ó Muirí (born 15 September 1972) is an Irish Fine Gael politician who has served as a Dublin City Councillor since June 2004. He previously served as Lord Mayor of Dublin from 2012 to 2013.

Ó Muirí studied at the NUI Galway. He is a self-employed engineer and runs his own technology company.

He was first elected to Dublin City Council in the 2004 local elections as a member for the Clontarf local electoral area. He was re-elected in June 2009.

He was an unsuccessful candidate in the Dublin North Central constituency at the 2011 general election. He stood again for the Dáil at the 2016 general election for Fine Gael in the new Dublin Bay-North constituency, but was again unsuccessful.

He was elected Lord Mayor of Dublin in June 2012 with 32 votes from Fine Gael and the Labour Party, beating the Independent Councillor Mannix Flynn by 6 votes and 11 abstentions.

Ó Muirí is married with children. He is a member of the Institution of Engineers of Ireland.

References

External links
Personal website

 

Fine Gael politicians
Politicians from County Galway
Lord Mayors of Dublin
Alumni of the University of Galway
20th-century Irish people
21st-century Irish people
Place of birth missing (living people)

Living people

1972 births